Apricotine may refer to:

 A French brand of apricot brandy, also known as Crème d'Abricot
 A variety of quartz; see List of minerals (synonyms)

See also
 Apricot (disambiguation)